Enver Maloku (2 February 1954, Podujevë – 11 January 1999) was a Kosovar Albanian journalist and writer and head of the Kosovo Information Centre. He was killed in Pristina on 11 January 1999 by the Yugoslav forces during the Kosovo War.

References

1954 births
1999 deaths
Kosovan murder victims
Kosovan journalists
People murdered in Kosovo
Kosovo Albanians
People from Podujevo
1999 crimes in Kosovo
1990s murders in Kosovo
1999 murders in Europe
20th-century journalists